Katrin Sjögren (born 2 February 1966) is a Finnish politician from Åland. She served as the Premier of Åland, a position she held from 25 November 2015 to 25 November 2019. She has also been the leader of the Liberals for Åland party since 2012.

Elected to the Parliament of Åland in 2003, Sjögren previously was Minister of Social Affairs and Environment between 2007 and 2011. She lives in Mariehamn with her husband Anders Eriksson and their three children.

References

1966 births
Living people
21st-century Finnish women politicians
Women heads of government of non-sovereign entities
Women government ministers of Åland
Premiers of Åland